At the Movies is the twenty-fourth album by jazz bassist Stanley Clarke.

Track listing 
All songs written by Stanley Clarke

 "Passenger 57 Main Title" - Passenger 57 – 3:22
 "Lisa" - Passenger 57 – 4:33
 "Justice's Groove" - Poetic Justice – 3:50
 "Lucky Again" - Poetic Justice – 5:58
 "Father and Son" - Boyz n the Hood – 1:33
 "Theme from  Boyz n the Hood" - Boyz n the Hood – 6:52
 "Grandpa's Theme" - Little Big League – 2:25
 "Higher Learning Main Title - Higher Learning – 2:31
 "The Learning Curve" – 3:29
 "Anna Mae" - What's Love Got to Do with It – 3:48
 "Capital/Naty's Theme" - Panther – 2:31
 "Meeting" - Panther – 1:34
 "Deja's Theme" - Higher Learning – 4:00
 "Black on Black Crime" - Boyz n the Hood – 4:38
 "Max's Theme" - Tap – 3:13

Personnel 

 Stanley Clarke  – bass, orchestration

Production 

 George DelBarrio  – Conductor
 Brian Gardner  – Mastering
 Dan Humann  – Engineer
 Howie Idelson  – Design
 William Kidd  – Conductor, Orchestration
 John Richards  – Engineer
 Steve Sykes  – Engineer
 Stephen Walker  – Art Direction
 Dan Wallin  – Engineer

References

1995 albums
Stanley Clarke albums
Epic Records albums
Albums produced by Stanley Clarke